The Battle of Dego took place in present-day Italy during the War of the First Coalition between French and Austrian armies on 21 September 1794. It resulted in a French victory. The battle was described in Napoleon's correspondence, he having been present.

The Austrian army attempted to seize Savona, but were checked by the French at Dego. The French plan of battle was drawn up by General of Artillery Napoleon Bonaparte. The commander-in-chief of the French forces, Pierre Jadart Dumerbion, reported the victory to the French government, writing of Bonaparte's involvement, "It is to the ability of the General of Artillery that I owe the clever combinations which have secured our success." The French did not follow up on this success, due to the grand strategy of the French government for a defensive war.

Notes

References
Smith, Digby (1998). The Napoleonic Wars Data Book. London: Greenhill Books. .
Napoleon. Correspondance de Napoléon Ier publiée par ordre de l'empereur Napoléon III. Paris, 1858–69, no. 37
Adlow, Elijah (1948). Napoleon in Italy. Plano: Wagram Press. .

External links
The text of Napoleon's letter describing the battle.

Battles of the War of the First Coalition
Battles involving France
Battles involving Austria
Battles involving Italy
Battles involving the Kingdom of Sardinia
Battles in Liguria
Conflicts in 1794